The Mayor of Hauraki officiates over the Hauraki District of New Zealand's North Island.

Toby Adams is the current mayor of Hauraki. Adams was re-elected unopposed in 2022 to serve a further three-year term.

List of mayors of Hauraki

References

Hauraki
Mayors of places in Waikato
Hauraki District